Clyde Norman Shealy, M.D., Ph.D. is a North American neurosurgeon.

Education 
Shealy graduated from Duke University School of Medicine, and completed his training at Duke University Medical Center, Barnes-Jewish Hospital, and Massachusetts General Hospital. Shealy is also a certified minister of the Nemenhah ITO.

Western Reserve Medical School 
Shealy spent 3½ years at Western Reserve Medical School researching and developing spinal cord stimulator and transcutaneous electrical nerve stimulator (TENS™).

References 

American neurosurgeons
Living people
Duke University School of Medicine alumni
Year of birth missing (living people)